Soekarmadji Maridjan Kartosuwiryo (7 January 1905 – 5 September 1962) was an Indonesian Islamic mystic who led the Darul Islam rebellion against the Indonesian government from 1949 to 1962, with the objective of overthrowing the secular Pancasila ideology and establishing Negara Islam Indonesia (Islamic State of Indonesia) based on sharia law.

Early life

Kartosuwiryo was born in Cepu, an oil-producing town in Central Java, son of minor government official. His education was mostly in secular and Dutch-medium schools. While attending NIAS (Nederlands-Indische Artsen School/ Netherlands Indies Medical College) in Surabaya, Kartosuwiryo boarded at the house of Islamist leader Tjokroaminoto and became actively involved in Tjokrominoto's PSII (Partai Sarekat Islam Indonesia/ Indonesian Islamic Union Party). Kartosuwiryo abandoned his medical studies to be fully immersed in politics.

While touring Malangbong, near Garut in West Java, Kartosuwiryo met and married daughter of a local PSII leader. He settled down in this area, where he established a madrasa. In 1937, he resigned from PSII to establish his own political movement advocating a future Islamic State of Indonesia based on Islamic law.

Leading the Darul Islam

During the Japanese occupation of Indonesia (1942–1945), Kartosuwiryo established armed militias in the Garut area, one of many such groups supported and armed by the Japanese in order to help them resist any future Allied invasion. During the Indonesian National Revolution, his Darul Islam militia remained in amicable terms with the secular Republican forces until the latter withdrew from West Java according to the terms of Renville Agreement in 1948, while Kartosuwiryo continued the guerrilla struggle against occupying Dutch forces. After the second Dutch offensive (Operation Kraai) in December 1948, Republican guerillas slipping back into West Java were attacked by Kartosuwiryo's militia, resulting in a triangular war between the Republican forces, Darul Islam, and the Dutch army.

On 7 August 1949, he declared establishment of Negara Islam Indonesia (Indonesian Islamic State) with himself as Imam. After the transfer of sovereignty from the Dutch, Kartosuwiryo refused to acknowledge returning Republican authority and continue attacking returning Republican forces, culminating into a full-blown insurgency.

During the 1950s, a weak central government and uncoordinated military response from the government allowed Darul Islam to flourish, controlling one-third of West Java and even launching raids as far as the outskirts of Jakarta. Islamic rebels in South Sulawesi and Aceh joined Darul Islam and acknowledged Kartosuwiryo as their highest authority through in practice there were little coordination between the rebels in the different provinces. In 1957, agents sent by Kartosuwiryo unsuccessfully attempted to assassinate Sukarno with a grenade attack during a primary school function at Cikini, Central Jakarta.

Defeat and death

Declaration of martial law in 1957 and establishment of Guided Democracy by Sukarno in 1959 proved to be a turning point for Darul Islam's fortunes. The military introduced the effective "fence of legs" method to encircle the guerillas' mountain bases and cut off their supply and escape routes, forcing the rebels to surrender or face annihilation in the face of superior firepower. Kartosuwiryo responded by declaring "total war" in 1961, in which Darul Islam guerillas increasingly used terror tactics and banditry against civilians, further alienating the population. He also sent agents to Jakarta, where in May 1962 they made another unsuccessful assassination attempt on Sukarno during the Eid al-Adha prayers.

In June 1962, Kartosuwiryo was eventually captured in his hideout at Mount Geber near Garut. In captivity, he issued order for his followers to surrender. The last Darul Islam band in West Java, operating at Mount Ciremai, surrendered in August 1962. Kartosuwiryo was brought to Jakarta, where he was tried by military court-martial. He was found guilty of rebellion and attempted assassination of the president, and was sentenced to death. He was executed by firing squad on 5 September 1962.

References

Further reading
 Dijk, C. van (Cornelis) Rebellion under the banner of Islam : the Darul Islam in Indonesia The Hague: M. Nijhoff,1981.
 Kilcullen, David "The political consequences of military operations in Indonesia 1945-99 : a fieldwork analysis of the political power-diffusion effects of guerilla conflict " PhD Thesis, University of New South Wales - Australian Defence Force Academy. School of Politics, 2000

1905 births
1962 deaths
People from Blora Regency
Javanese people
Indonesian Muslims
Indonesian Islamists
Indonesian collaborators with Imperial Japan
Indonesian independence activists
Indonesian rebels
Islamic mysticism
People of the Indonesian National Revolution
People executed by Indonesia by firing squad